Gogi Alauddin (born September 9, 1950, in Lahore, Pakistan) is a former squash player from Pakistan. He was one of the game's leading players in the 1970s.

Gogi won the British Amateur championship in 1970 and 1971, and the Pakistan Open in 1972 and 1973. He was also runner-up at the British Open in 1973 and 1975. He reached a career-high world ranking of World No. 2.

Since retiring as a player, he has worked as a squash coach. He is considered to be the best squash coach of all time by many professionals. His son is the captain of the Trinity College Squash Team, which once defeated the Harvard Squash Team as well.

Gogi had a post-retirement appearance as a player at the FMC 2nd Asian Squash Masters Tournament, where he won a gold medal for his age bracket (60+)

References

External links 
 
 Interview with PakistanToday
 Gogi Displays his class in Asian Masters
 

1950 births
Living people
Pakistani male squash players